The UNASUR Constitutive Treaty, officially the Constitutive Treaty of the Union of South American Nations, was signed on May 23, 2008 during the extraordinary summit of heads of state and government of the Union of South American Nations (UNASUR) held in Brasília, Brazil. It officially established the Union of South American Nations, an intergovernmental continental union of all twelve South American nations.

Signatories

Ratification
The Constitutive Treaty of the Union of South American Nations came into force on March 11, 2011, thirty days after the date of receipt of the ninth instrument of ratification.

Treaty content
The treaty consists of 27 relatively short sections, and is the constitution of the new union. It outlines its structure and organs, and assumes that additional documents fill in the details.

Summary
The treaty declares the establishment and objects of the Union (in §§ 1-3), its organs (§§ 4-10 and 17), juridical foundation (§§ 11-13 and 22-27), and financial foundation (§ 16). It regulates the acceptance of new associate or full members and the right of cessation from the union in §§ 19, 20, 24, and 26, and the rules for adopting amendments to the treaty in § 25. Finally, §§ 14, 15, 18, and 21 declare the intent to employ dialogue among the member states, with its citizens, with third parties, and as the means for conflict resolution.

Membership
The 12 original signatories of the document have presented documentation of ratification to the Ecuadorian government. Other Latin American and Caribbean states may be admitted as associated members. An associated member may apply for and be granted full membership, but only after having been associated for at least four years, and only after five years have elapsed since the treaty came into force. This implies that no new full members outside the original twelve can be admitted before March 11, 2016.

A full or associated member state may unilaterally withdraw from the union. To do so, the state must deposit their cessation documentation in a similar manner as the ratification, and the cessation will take effect six months after the deposition.  However, cessation of membership will not free states from any financial debts to the Union for unpaid membership fees or otherwise.

At the time the treaty came into force on March 11, 2011, it had been ratified by Argentina, Bolivia, Chile, Colombia, Ecuador, Guyana, Peru, Suriname, Uruguay, and Venezuela. The two other original signatories, Brazil and Paraguay, had not yet completed the ratification process by that date.  By December 14, 2011, when Colombia deposited its instruments of ratification of the Constitutive Treaty with the Government of the Republic of Ecuador, the process was complete.

Amendments
Any member state may suggest amendments to the constitutional treaty. In order to be adopted, an amendment must be approved by the Council of Heads of State and Government, and then ratified by at least nine member states.

Additional Protocol

On November 26, 2010, during the 2010 South American Summit, representatives introduced a democratic clause to the Constitutive Treaty of the Union of South American Nations. The amendment specifies measures to be taken against member-states whose political processes are not respected. The clause establishes sanctions, such as shutting down borders and the suspension of trade against the country that suffers an attempted coup.

The decision to include a democratic clause was made after the recent upheaval in Ecuador that briefly threatened the administration of President, Rafael Correa. The additional protocol was signed by all member-states of UNASUR.

Entering into force
On March 11, 2011, when the Constitutive Treaty entered into legal force, establishing the Union of South American Nations as an international legal personality, the Foreign Ministers of the UNASUR member states met at Ciudad Mitad del Mundo, Ecuador, to celebrate the event and lay the foundation stone of the UNASUR Secretariat headquarters.

See also
 Cusco Declaration

References

External links
 South American Union of Nations Constitutive Treaty

Union of South American Nations
Treaties concluded in 2008
Treaties entered into force in 2011
Treaties of Argentina
Treaties of Bolivia
Treaties of Brazil
Treaties of Chile
Treaties of Colombia
Treaties of Ecuador
Treaties of Guyana
Treaties of Paraguay
Treaties of Peru
Treaties of Suriname
Treaties of Uruguay
Treaties of Venezuela
Treaties establishing intergovernmental organizations